Manyshta (Manıştı) is a rural locality (a selo) in Inzersky Selsoviet, Beloretsky District, Bashkortostan, Russia. The population was 372 as of 2010. There are 11 streets.

Geography 
Manyshta is located 96 km northwest of Beloretsk (the district's administrative centre) by road. Safargulovo is the nearest rural locality.

References 

Rural localities in Beloretsky District